Rauvolfia nukuhivensis  is a species of plant in the family Apocynaceae. It is endemic to Nuku Hiva in the Marquesas Islands in French Polynesia.

In 1988, the species was classified as extinct by the IUCN. However, extant populations have since been documented in several localities on Nuku Hiva, and it is now considered Critically Endangered instead.

References

nukuhivensis
Flora of the Marquesas Islands
Flora of French Polynesia

Critically endangered flora of Oceania